Tep Pranam (Khmer: ប្រាសាទទេពប្រណម្យ) is a temple with a giant seated Buddha, built from sandstone blocks is still worshiped here. The interior of the figure re-uses many stone blocks while the head appears somewhat later.

Plan 

To the north of the Terrace of the Leper King and the Royal palace, the image is approached from the east along a 75m laterite causeway, 8m wide. This causeway ends on the west in a terrace with double sema (Buddhist boundary markers) at the corners and on the axes. The building housing the image would have been in wood, long since disappeared and was constructed on a cruciform foundation.

References 

Angkorian sites in Siem Reap Province
Buddhist temples in Siem Reap Province